Weerawansa is a surname. Notable people with the surname include:

Dinesh Weerawansa (born 1966), Sri Lankan journalist
Wimal Weerawansa (born 1965), Sri Lankan politician

Sinhalese surnames